Pseudoneuroterus mazandarani is a gall wasp species in the family Cynipidae whose life cycle involves only Palaearctic oaks, Quercus subgen. Quercus, in the section Cerris. The species is named for the Mazandaran province of Iran where it was collected. Gall wasps evolved in the Northern Hemisphere and started as herb gallers. Through natural selection they went through a period where they lost the ability to initiate galls and later regained it back. (Stone, 2002) It is suggested the first gall wasps were associated with woody host plants.

References 

Cynipidae
Gall-inducing insects
Insects described in 2010
Insects of Iran

Stone, G. N., Schönrogge, K., Atkinson, R. J., Bellido, D., & Pujade-Villar, J. (2002). THE POPULATION BIOLOGY OF OAK GALL WASPS (HYMENOPTERA: CYNIPIDAE). Annual Review of Entomology, 47(1), 633–668. https://doi.org/10.1146/annurev.ento.47.091201.145247